John Hewet (fl. 1413–1422) was an English Member of Parliament for Leicester in May 1413 and 1422.

References

14th-century births
15th-century deaths
15th-century English people
Year of death missing
Year of birth missing
Place of death missing
Place of birth missing
English MPs 1422
English MPs May 1413